Hey Stoopid is the twelfth solo studio album by American rock singer Alice Cooper, released on July 2, 1991, by Epic Records. After his smash 1989 hit album Trash, Cooper attempted to continue his success with his follow-up album, which features guest performances from Lance Bulen, Slash, Ozzy Osbourne, Vinnie Moore, Joe Satriani, Steve Vai, Nikki Sixx and Mick Mars (both of Mötley Crüe). Hey Stoopid was Cooper's last album to feature bassist Hugh McDonald before he joined Bon Jovi in 1994.

According to Cooper assistant Brian Renfield, an alternate cover was originally considered, described by Renfield as being "hardcore with hypo needles, pills..." Notably, the track "Feed My Frankenstein" features famed guitar duo Steve Vai and Joe Satriani playing together, accompanied by Nikki Sixx on bass. It is also featured in the 1992 comedy film Wayne's World and on the official soundtrack. In 2014, "Dangerous Tonight" was featured in the video game Watch Dogs.

Track listing

Japanese release bonus track

2013 remastered release bonus tracks

Stoopid News
In 1991, alongside the release of the album, a promotional CD entitled Stoopid News (Epic ESK 4161) was released featuring 15 sound bites read by Alice Cooper, as follows:

 "Rock N' Roll Bat Belts Hits"
 "Voodoo Snake Cures Headaches?"
 "She-Male Werewolf Captured Alive"
 "Buying Goats to Watch 'Em Faint"
 "Poop Lady Raking It In"
 "Bar Serves Human Blood Cocktails"
 "Russian Men Won't Act in Porn"
 "Wild Man Raised by Cows"
 "Outer Space Blobs Eating Our Planes"
 "Man Paid $3000 for Being Stinky"
 "Father Shoot at Son over Monopoly"
 "Single Man Collects Dirty Diapers"
 "Woman Beats Self Senseless with Own Hand"
 "Man Tries To Sell Senseless with Own Hand"
 "Hubbies Ghost Made Me Pregnant"

Outtakes
 "It Rained All Night" (B-side to "Hey Stoopid" single)
 "Chemical Reaction" (a mid-quality demo with tape hiss has leaked on several fan-made compilations)
 "Fire" (B-side to "Love's a Loaded Gun" single, later released on The Life and Crimes of Alice Cooper and Classicks)
 "Underground" (unreleased)
 "Your Love Is My Prison" (unreleased)
 "If Fourth Street Could Talk" (unreleased)
 "Take It like a Woman" (not the same as released on Brutal Planet)

Personnel
Alice Cooper – vocals, harmonica
Stef Burns – guitar
Hugh McDonald – bass
Lance Bulen – backing vocals 
Mickey Curry – drums
Additional personnel 
Slash – guitar (track 1)
Joe Satriani – guitar (tracks 1, 4, 7, 9, 12), backing vocals (track 1)
Steve Vai – guitar (track 7)
Vinnie Moore – guitar (tracks 8, 11)
Mick Mars – guitar (track 10)
Nikki Sixx – bass (track 7)
John Webster – keyboards (tracks 1 – 4, 7, 9, 10, 12), Hammond B3 Organ (track 5)
Robert Bailey – keyboards (tracks 2, 5 – 8, 10, 12)
Jai Winding – keyboards (track 6)
Chris Boardman – string arrangement (track 6)
Steve Croes – synclavier (tracks 1, 10)
Ozzy Osbourne – backing vocals (track 1)
Zachary Nevel – backing vocals (track 1)

Charts

Weekly charts

Year-end charts

Singles

Certifications

References

Alice Cooper albums
1991 albums
Epic Records albums
Albums produced by Peter Collins (record producer)
Glam metal albums